The Mid Coast is a region of the U.S. state of Maine that includes the coastal counties of Waldo, Knox, Lincoln, and Sagadahoc; and the towns of Brunswick and Harpswell in Cumberland County. 
Some of the towns are:
Alna 
Arrowsic
Bath
Belfast
Boothbay
Boothbay Harbor
Bowdoin
Bowdoinham
Bremen
Bristol
Brunswick
Camden
Cushing
Damariscotta
Dresden
Edgecomb
Friendship
Georgetown
Harpswell
Jefferson
Lincolnville
Monhegan
Newcastle
Nobleboro
Phippsburg
Richmond
Rockland
Rockport
Searsport
Stockton Springs
Southport
Thomaston
Topsham
Union
Waldoboro
Warren
Westport Island
West Bath
Whitefield
Wiscasset
Woolwich

The Mid Coast is a popular tourist destination, and many people own summer homes in the region.  The area includes much of Maine's rock-bound coast. The area is also home to Mid Coast Hospital in Brunswick.

References

External links
 Maine's Midcoast
 Southern Midcoast Maine Chamber
 Boothbay Harbor Region Chamber of Commerce
 Damariscotta Region Chamber
 Camden Rockland Area
 Wiscasset Area Chamber

Regions of Maine